The Moves Make The Man is a sports novel written by author Bruce Brooks that deals with many issues in society including racism, domestic violence, abuse, and family deaths.  It was chosen best book of 1984 by School Library Journal (SLJ), ALA Notable Children's Book, notable book of the year New York Times, and won the Boston Globe-Horn Book Award and a Newbery Honor in 1985.

Setting
The book is set in North Carolina around the time of the Civil Rights Movement, in 1961. It is written in first person and narrated by an African-American child named Jerome Foxworthy, who goes by the nickname of Jayfox. He is the only African-American in his school and going through problems being forced to integrate. He covers the stories leading up to the relationship between him and a young white boy named Braxton Rivers III, otherwise known as Bix: about when he first saw him playing baseball, Bix's freaking out in Home Ec class, and teaching him basketball on a court in the woods at night. Braxton is a child who never says anything that is not a truth, which brings him problems others cannot understand, and eventually he runs away. The book covers problems happening in both his and Jerome's families. 
This book was published by Harper & Row.

Characters
Jerome. Jerome the narrator and main character is a teenage African American male and loves to play basketball.  He is being raised by a single mother. He meets Bix (Braxton Rivers) in a Home Economics class he has to take after it is discovered his mom has been injured and Jerome needs to learn to take care of his older siblings.

Bix whose real name is Braxton Rivers, is a friend of Jerome. Bix used to tell the truth but he stops after he finds out how the truth hurt his mother and those around him. Bix loved baseball, but Jerome helped him learn how to play basketball and not 'bounceball'. One day Bix had played a game of one-on-one against his stepfather to earn the right to see his mother in the mental hospital.

1984 American novels
American sports novels
American young adult novels
Newbery Honor-winning works
Novels set in North Carolina
Fiction set in 1961
1984 children's books